Kenneth McLaren DSO (sometimes given as "MacLaren"), (1860–1924) was a Major in the 13th Hussars regiment of the British Army. After his military service he assisted with the growth of the Scouting movement founded by his friend Robert Baden-Powell.

Military service

Son of H. McLaren, of The Chalet, Tighnabruaich, Argyllshire, Scotland (the family home was later Dunmar at Tighnabruaich) McLaren was educated at Harrow and Sandhurst before joining his regiment, the 13th Hussars in 1880. He was posted to India, where he served as regimental adjutant and later aide de camp to General Baker Russell. In South Africa he was gravely wounded at the Siege of Mafeking in March 1900, and taken prisoner by the Boers. He was created a Companion of the Distinguished Service Order (DSO) in November 1900.
McLaren played polo throughout his military service, and was umpire of one of the two matches in the 1908 London Olympics.

McLaren first met Baden-Powell (also a 13th Hussars officer) in 1881. Although McLaren was 20 at the time, Baden-Powell nicknamed him "the Boy", on account of his appearance. The two became fast friends, their relationship being one of the most important friendships in Baden-Powell's life.

McLaren volunteered his services and was recalled to military service in World War I, serving in France with the Casualty Records Department, but retired again in 1915 due to the onset of the first symptoms of "softening of the brain" (according to Baden-Powell his friend suffered also from "melancholia").

Boy Scouts

McLaren was one of the staff at Baden-Powell's Brownsea Island Scout camp in 1907. Baden-Powell convinced McLaren to be his first manager at the C. Arthur Pearson Limited office of The Scout magazine but McLaren resigned that position in March 1908.

Personal life
In 1898 McLaren married Leila Evelyn Landon. Their daughter, Eilean, was born in 1899; Baden-Powell was her godfather. He had been unable to return from India to serve as best man at McLaren's wedding. Leila McLaren died in 1904 aged 29 of "disseminated sclerosis".

In 1910, McLaren married his wife's former nurse, Ethel Mary Wilson. She was the daughter of a "struggling south Yorkshire farmer" and Baden-Powell, who did not consider her a "lady", advised McLaren against the marriage. Although at the time of their wedding Baden-Powell was crossing the Atlantic at the time after a Scouting tour of North America, he had no intention of attending. McLaren was not invited to Baden-Powell's own wedding in 1912. Owing to Olave Baden-Powell's jealousy over Baden-Powell's friendships, the two men never met again.

After retiring from the Army in 1915 due to symptoms of "softening of the brain", McLaren spent the last years of his life confined at Camberwell House Asylum and at a smaller private mental hospital in Hertfordshire. Baden-Powell did not attend his funeral, but remained in contact with his goddaughter Eilean, inviting her to stay a few days each month and sending her birthday greetings. She married a boatman, they later separated and he went to ply his trade on the Norfolk coast, and had a son; her later life was "wretched" and she drank heavily, dying of cancer in 1957. Her son Christopher found "nothing at all connected with his grandfather" in her possession.

References

1860 births
1924 deaths
13th Hussars officers
People educated at Harrow School
The Scout Association
Scouting pioneers
British Army personnel of the Second Boer War
Companions of the Distinguished Service Order
British Army personnel of the Mahdist War
British military personnel of the First Mohmand Campaign
British Army personnel of World War I
British prisoners of war of the Second Boer War